Land of My Fathers is a 1921 British silent drama film directed by Fred Rains and starring John Stuart, Edith Pearson and Yvonne Thomas.

Cast
 John Stuart - David Morgan 
 Edith Pearson - Lady Gwenneth Beailah 
 Yvonne Thomas - Dilwys Colwyn 
 George Leyton - Lord Beaulah 
 Florence Lynn - Mrs. Colwyn 
 Ernest Moore - Owen Morgan 
 Fred Rains - Bad Bill 
 David Teriotdale - Agent

References

External links

1921 films
British drama films
British black-and-white films
British silent feature films
1921 drama films
1920s English-language films
1920s British films
Silent drama films